Cruel, Crazy, Beautiful World is a studio album from South African artist Johnny Clegg and his band Savuka.

Released in 1989 and produced by Hilton Rosenthal and Bobby Summerfield, it is today recognized as probably the band's greatest album, containing hits such as "Dela" and "Cruel, Crazy, Beautiful World". The title track is addressed and dedicated to Clegg's son Jesse, born in 1988, who is depicted on Clegg's shoulders on the album cover. The song "One (Hu)' Man One Vote" was written in honor of David Webster, a friend of Johnny Clegg and anti-apartheid activist who had been assassinated three weeks earlier. The lyrics of "Warsaw 1943" were inspired from the works of Polish author Czesław Miłosz. In Canada, the album reached #67, March 24, 1990.

The title track appears in the soundtrack of the movie Opportunity Knocks.

In 1997, the song "Dela (I Know Why the Dog Howls at the Moon)" was released on the soundtrack of Disney's George of the Jungle.

Track listing
All songs written by Johnny Clegg except as noted.

 "One (Hu)' Man One Vote" (Johnny Clegg, Bobby Summerfield)
 "Cruel, Crazy, Beautiful World"
 "Jericho"
 "Dela (I Know Why the Dog Howls at the Moon)"
 "Moliva"
 "It's an Illusion"
 "Bombs Away"
 "Woman Be My Country"
 "Rolling Ocean" (Clegg, Steve Mavuso)
 "Warsaw 1943 (I Never Betrayed The Revolution)"
 "Vezandlebe" (hidden track)

Personnel
Johnny Clegg - vocals, guitars, concertina, mouth bow
Mandisa Dlanga - vocals
Solly Letwaba – bass guitar, vocals
Derek de Beer – drums, percussion, vocals
Keith Hutchinson – keyboards, flute, saxophone, vocals
Steve Mavuso – keyboards, vocals
Dudu Zulu – percussion, vocals

Additional personnel 
Alex Acuña - percussion
Tom Regis - keyboards
Benn Clatworthy - tenor saxophone
Howard Shear - trumpet
Roy Wigan - trumpet
John Baxter - backing vocals
Bobby Summerfield - mixer, recording engineer, keyboards, drum programming, electronic percussion
Hilton Rosenthal - keyboards, backing vocals

Savuka albums
Capitol Records albums
1989 albums